Paul Louis Rossi (born 1933 Nantes, Brittany) is a French critic and poet.

Life
His grandparents Queffelec spoke Breton and Cornish.  His father was Italian, of the Venice area. He was shot by the Germans in 1943 in Tübingen, when Rossi was ten years old.

He published a booklet entitled Liturgy for the night in 1958, during the Algerian War.  He came to work early to Paris; he wanted to become a journalist.  He wrote music reviews: in Jazz Magazine and in the Cahiers du jazz, and film criticism: "The Arbitrary", dedicated to Robert Bresson, published in Camera Pen.  He collaborated with French Letters and the journal Change, directed by Jean-Pierre Faye.  In the 1970s he made, with Jacques Roubaud, Lionel Ray, and Pierre Lartigue, exercises on the world Oulipo: The Inimaginaires.  His travel book of St. Ursula was published by Gallimard in 1973.

He lives in Paris.

Awards
1995 Mallarmé prize

Works

Elévation de l'enclume (1997)
Escalation of the anvil (1997)

La Voyageuse immortelle (2001)
Le Voyage de Sainte-Ursule (Gallimard, 1973)
La Traversée du Rhin (Hachette POL, 1981)
Crossing the Rhine (POL Hachette, 1981)

Régine (Julliard, 1990)
Cose Naturali (Éd. Unes, 1991)
La Montagne de Kaolin (Julliard, 1992)

Le Fauteuil rouge (Julliard, 1994)

Le Vieil homme et la nuit (Julliard, 1997)
André Lambotte (ARTGO, Bruxelles, 1997)
La vie secrète de Fra Angelico (Bayard, 1997)
Cose Naturali (Éd. Ergo Pers Gent, 1997)

Fuscelli (Éd. Tandem, Belgique, 2000)

References

External links
"Paul Louis Rossi", P O L Catalogue
"Paul Louis Rossi", Le Printemps des Poetes

Writers from Nantes
1931 births
Living people
French literary critics
French art critics
Jazz writers
20th-century French poets
21st-century French poets
21st-century French male writers
French male poets
20th-century French male writers
French male non-fiction writers